Sport climbing at the 2018 Summer Youth Olympics was held from 7 to 10 October. The competition took place at the Parque Urbano in Puerto Madero, Buenos Aires, Argentina. This marked the debut of the sport at the Youth Olympics.

Qualification

Each National Olympic Committee (NOC) could enter a maximum of 4 competitors, 2 per each gender event. As hosts, Argentina was given 2 quotas, 1 per each gender event provided that they participate at the Youth World Championships. A further 2 quotas, 1 in each gender could be allocated by the Tripartite Commission. The remaining 36 places shall be decided in two qualification phases; the 2017 Youth World Championship and five continental championships.

Shortly before the deadline for entries in September, The IOC informed the IFSC 1 additional female athlete and 1 additional male athlete were added to the quota for Sport Climbing, raising the number of qualified athletes to 21 female athletes and 21 male athletes.

To be eligible to participate at the Youth Olympics athletes needed to have been born between 1 January 2000 and 31 December 2001.

Although two athletes from the United States, Ashima Shiraishi and Brooke Raboutou, finished second and third at the Youth World Championship and were included on preliminary lists of qualified athletes, the United States Olympic Committee declined to allow them to participate, citing a fixed limit on the total number of athletes that it could send to all events, and a low prioritization of the climbing event based on the fact that USA Climbing had applied for recognition by the USOC but not yet received it.
Similarly, Chinese female athlete Song Yi Ling qualified through the Youth World Championship but was not included on the final starting list of athletes for the Youth Olympics.

The qualified athletes were as follows:

Boys

Girls

Schedule

The competition followed the Olympic format, with each athlete competing in Speed, Bouldering and then Lead. The ranking was calculated by multiplying the placing in the individual events, with a lower combined score resulting in a better ranking. The top 6 ranked athletes progressed to the final.

Medal summary

Medal table

Events

References

External links
Official Results Book – Climbing

 
2018 Summer Youth Olympics events
2018
2018 in sport climbing